Ágnes Pozsonyi is a Hungarian sprint canoer who competed in the mid-1970s. She won a bronze medal in the K-4 500 m event at the 1975 ICF Canoe Sprint World Championships in Belgrade.

References

Hungarian female canoeists
Living people
Year of birth missing (living people)
ICF Canoe Sprint World Championships medalists in kayak